Anna Botova (born March 25, 1987) is a Russian model, singer who was crowned as the 1st runner-up at Miss Globe International 2010 and Miss Asia Pacific World 2011.

Early life and education
Born in Astrakhan, Russia, Botova grew up under the tutelage of her grandmother who enrolled her in a music school. She graduated from the Peoples' Friendship University of Russia with a degree in law.

Career
Botova began a career in music in her early childhood. She became a soloist for a music group known as  "Genuch DI7". Botova started touring across Russia performing as a model and singer at various occasions.  She obtained a modeling contract in Paris and eventually became the face of a Parisian boutique. She later returned to Russia and worked for the biggest Russian modeling agency. She participated and won prizes in various beauty pageant contests held across Russia.

Awards and honors
 Miss People's Choice Award (Miss Astrakhan region 2003)
 Miss LG 2005 (1st place)
 Best Astrakhan podium Model 2006 (2nd place)
 Miss Astrakhan region in 2007 (1st place)
 Miss Volga  2008 (1st Vice-Miss)
 Miss Beauty & Miss Global Beauty Queen International 2009 (1st runner-up)
 Miss Runet 2010 (1st place)
 Miss Bikini International 2010 (1st Lady Winter)
 Miss Globe International 2010 (1st runner-up)
 Miss Asia Pacific World 2011 (1st runner-up)

Personal life
Botova lives in Moscow.

References

1987 births
Russian female models
21st-century Russian women singers
21st-century Russian singers
Russian beauty pageant winners
Living people